Michael John Reynolds (15 August 1939 – 22 March 2018) was a Canadian actor who has featured in over one hundred films.

Selected filmography

 The Reincarnate (1971) .... David
 The Discoverers (1972) .... Dr. Frederick Banting
 The Neptune Factor (1973) .... Dr. Hal Hamilton
 Age of Innocence (1977) .... Helmut
 Why Shoot the Teacher? (1977) .... Bert Field
 Search and Rescue (1977, TV Series) .... Dr. Bob Donell
 Plague (1979) .... Dr. Dave McKay
 Fish Hawk (1979) .... Mr. Gideon
 Bear Island (1979) .... Heyter
 Wild Horse Hank (1979) .... Rankin
 The Kidnapping of the President (1980) .... MacKenzie
 Visiting Hours (1982) .... Porter Halstrom
 Running Brave (1983) .... Roger Douglas, Insurance Executive
 Police Academy (1984) .... Office Executive
 The Truth About Alex (1986, TV Movie) .... Major Stevens
 Rolling Vengeance (1987) .... Art Sheffield
 Too Outrageous! (1987)
 Blue Monkey (1987) .... Albert Hooper
 Rolling Vengeance (1987) .... Lt. Sly Sullivan
 Deep Sea Conspiracy (1987) .... Dr. Cambridge
 Gorillas in the Mist (1988) .... Howard Dowd
 Iron Eagle II (1988) .... Secretary
 The Twilight Zone (1989, TV Series) .... Commander Delhart
 Millennium (1989) .... Jerry Bannister
 The Last Best Year (1990, TV Movie) .... Wisnovsky
 Clearcut (1991) .... Hunter
 Tafelspitz (1994) .... Mr. Nicholson
 Blown Away (1994) .... Wedding Band #1
 Fly Away Home (1996) .... General
 Extreme Measures (1996) .... Judge
 That Old Feeling (1997) .... Senator Marks
 Ms. Scrooge (1997, TV Movie) .... Ghost of Christmas Past
 All I Wanna Do (1998) .... Mr. Armstrong
 Down (2001) .... President
 The 51st State (2001) .... Mr. Escobar
 Out for a Kill (2003) .... Dean
 Blessed (2004) .... Dr. Lehman
 Where the Truth Lies (2005) .... John Hillman
 United 93 (2006) .... Patrick Joseph Driscoll
 Dark Corners (2006) .... Dr. Richardson
 The Walker (2007) .... Ethan Withal
 Freakdog (2008) .... Dr. Stegman
 World War II Behind Closed Doors: Stalin, the Nazis and the West (2008, TV Series documentary) .... Gen. George C. Marshall
 The Descent Part 2 (2009) .... Ed Oswald
 Leap Year (2010) .... Jerome
 Charlie Countryman (2013) .... Doctor

References

External links

1939 births
2018 deaths
Canadian male film actors
Canadian male television actors
Canadian male voice actors